Leleupidia is a genus of beetles in the family Carabidae, containing the following species:

 Leleupidia angusticollis Basilewsky, 1953
 Leleupidia coiffaiti Mateu, 1970
 Leleupidia elilae Basilewsky, 1960
 Leleupidia emerita Basilewsky, 1951
 Leleupidia grossepunctata Basilewsky, 1953
 Leleupidia kaboboana Basilewsky, 1960
 Leleupidia kahuziana Basilewsky, 1953
 Leleupidia luvubuana Basilewsky, 1951
 Leleupidia ruandana Basilewsky, 1951
 Leleupidia vadoni Basilewsky, 1967

References

Dryptinae